Charles Goodman Tebbutt (1860–1944) was an English speed skater and bandy player  from Bluntisham, England, in the Fens of Cambridgeshire  where Fen skating was a popular winter activity in the nineteenth century.

He also wrote articles and books about speed skating and bandy, including several chapters in the Badminton Library book Skating (1892) with John Moyer Heathcote. He wrote a chapter on matches in Holland and Sweden in A Handbook of Bandy by Arnold Tebbutt.

He is said to have been the first player to establish the rules of bandy and popularize the sport in Northern Europe, Sweden, Norway and Denmark.

References

External links
 A photograph of three of the Tebbutt brothers. The Tebbutt brothers are in the front row, with Charles Goodman on the left.
 An article about bandy and the Tebbutts from Cambridgeshire Archives

1860 births
1944 deaths
People from Bluntisham
English bandy players